The water conflict between Ethiopia and Kenya is a development dispute due to the receding water resource along the border between Ethiopia and Kenya.

Overview 
Ethiopia decided to build the Gilgel Gibe III Dam on the Omo River to provide hydropower electricity to Ethiopia as well as Egypt, Sudan, Djibouti, Kenya, Uganda and Yemen. Considering rising temperatures, desertification and because the Omo is the main water source for several Ethiopian and Kenyan tribes, the dam could potentially cause violent conflict. Professor Aaron Wolf identified the problem's two major factors as:economic and population growth, and institutional capacity, or "human systems built to mitigate the change".

In the border area between Ethiopia and Kenya, The Turkana of Kenya and the Dassanech, Nyangatom and Mursi of Ethiopia are tribes that depend on the Omo River and Lake Turkana to survive. In the past years the area became drier, with a hot climate and prolonged drought. Population growth aggravated the problem. The people live in a pastoral system, moving around wherever resources can be found. In years of scarcity conflicts happen almost every day.

Lake Turkana receives 90 percent of its water from Omo River. Rising temperatures and reduced rainfall have contributed to the lake's retreat into Kenya. To survive, the Ethiopians tribes began following the water. As a result, intertribal conflict is increasing.

As of 2005, at least four Ethiopians and 20 Kenyans had died, although some Kenyan government officials placed the toll as high as 69, according to the Kenya-based Daily Nation. The localized fighting pressured both nations to address the conflict.

According to John Nunyes, a member of Kenya's parliament, Ethiopians had moved  inside Kenya. "They have stopped our Turkana people from fishing, they have thrown us out of the pastures, we can't access the waters. We allowed our communities to continue fighting and competing over resources", he said.

In 2011, an estimated 900 armed militia and 2,500 Ethiopian civilians on Kenyan territory around lake Turkana increased attacks against Kenyans. The Kenyan government claimed that these illegal immigrants had taken control of 10 Kenyan villages and vowed to send them back to Ethiopia.

The dispute was driven both by territorial claims and access to water resources.

Tribes

Turkana people 
The Turkana are frequently attacked by the Ethiopian tribes. In May 2011, a dozen Ethiopians allegedly killed Kenya's head of the Border Police, John Nunyes, a Kenyan Parliament member who visited the Turkana community. Before dramatic climate changes, the area inhabited by the Turkana people enabled the sustainability of livestock herds. This was because of the area's predictable rainfall and availability of land.
Many people are now migrating toward the Turkana's territory and most Turkana tribesmen are suffering from the loss of pasture and access to water.

Daasanach people 
The Daasanach share a traditional border with the Turkana. However, the border is moving toward south because of receding water. According to the Christian Science Monitor, the Daasanach have begun cultivating the land and fishing using the waters of the River Omo-Lake Turkana Delta in competition with the Kenyan Turkana people for both land and water resources.

Nyangatom people 
The Nayangatom are cattle herders who use Omo River water for their animals. Those who are displaced internally rely on government and foreign support, which is not always well thought out. For example, the international community sent foods such as maize, which cannot be eaten raw and requires a lot of water to cook.

Incidents

See also
Kenya water crisis

References 

Ethiopia–Kenya relations
Water conflicts